Jordan Davis (born January 21, 1983) is a former American soccer player and former manager of the PDL's Peachtree City MOBA.

Career

College and Amateur
Davis grew up in Peachtree City, Georgia, and attended Starr's Mill High School and began his college soccer at Charleston Southern University, transferring to Georgia State University before his sophomore season. During his college years Davis also played with the Columbus Shooting Stars and the Richmond Kickers Future in the USL Premier Development League.

Professional
Undrafted out of college, Davis joined the Atlanta Silverbacks organization as a player and coach, playing three more seasons in the USL Premier Development League for the Silverbacks' PDL affiliate, Atlanta Silverbacks U23s. He went on to play three seasons for the Silverbacks in the PDL, leading the team in minutes played, before leaving when the entire Silverbacks organization went on hiatus at the end of the 2008 season.

After serving as the Director of Coaching for the Coweta Cannons youth soccer club in Newnan, Georgia and an assistant coach at Clayton State University, Davis returned to the professional ranks in 2011 when signed with the reformed Atlanta Silverbacks for their debut season in the North American Soccer League. He made his debut for his new team on April 9, 2011 in a game against the NSC Minnesota Stars

Davis was the U13/15/17 Boys Program Director for the Southern Soccer Academy. He also served as an assistant coach for the women's soccer program at the University of West Georgia.

Manager 
Jordan Davis was hired by the Peachtree City MOBA football club of the Premier Development League as the first manager for the organization on January 20, 2016. The expansion club is based is Peachtree City, Georgia, where Davis played high school soccer. Following the 2016 season, Davis departed the team due to conflicts with his youth club.

References

External links
Atlanta Silverbacks bio

1983 births
Living people
People from Peachtree City, Georgia
Sportspeople from the Atlanta metropolitan area
Soccer players from Salt Lake City
American soccer players
Association football midfielders
Georgia State Panthers men's soccer players
Columbus Shooting Stars players
Richmond Kickers Future players
Atlanta Silverbacks U23's players
Atlanta Silverbacks players
Georgia Revolution FC players
USL League Two players
North American Soccer League players